Çaltıcak can refer to:

 Çaltıcak, Çorum
 Çaltıcak, Dursunbey